Syrian hamster care includes all the actions which a person might take to promote animal welfare in the Syrian hamster when it lives with humans either as a pet or laboratory animal.

Enclosure

There are some different recommendations for what cage size is appropriate for hamsters.

The bedding should not be pine wood shavings, cedar wood shavings, most soft wood shavings, or corn cob shavings, because those have been known to cause respiratory problems. Corn cob shavings do not pose a threat to a hamster's respiratory system, but instead pose a threat to their weight, for this bedding is edible, and some hamsters enjoy nibbling it. That increases the risk of obesity. The bedding should also not be cotton, as that can cause choking, as well as getting wrapped around hamster’s limbs and cutting off circulation. Paper-based bedding, aspen shavings mixed with soft hay and spruce shavings are safer alternatives. When buying paper-based bedding, make sure it is not the scented kind, as this can be toxic for your hamster and cause respiratory problems. The bedding in the enclosure should be pressed down firmly to allow to hamster to create stable burrows. When pressed down, the bedding height should be at least 30-40 cm (12-16 inches) high to allow for burrowing, as hamsters show fewer stress behaviours when given enough bedding to burrow in, though a bedding height of 80 cm (31.5 inches) or more, if possible, is preferred. To make sure that the hamster burrowing below does not get injured or squished, always place heavy objects like ceramic hides, the sand bath and the wheel on stilts. The cage should also include an appropriately sized exercise wheel. For Syrian hamsters, a diameter of 12 inches is a minimum (studies have found that they prefer  over ). The running surface cannot be wire or mesh because that can cause bumblefoot. Silent spinner wheels are a good alternative. Flying saucers, on the other hand, should not be used, as if a hamster tries to stop or slips they will be thrown off. They can also cause spinal issues, as the spine curves unnaturally to the side when running on them. The cage should also provide at least one sheltering structure for sleeping; this can be as simple as an opaque tube closed at one end. For fur care, hamsters should have a sand bath permanently available in their enclosure, or otherwise their fur can become greasy and unhealthy.

Environment

Hamsters should experience 12-16 hours of light per day. Among other health effects, daily exposure to light influences the estrous cycle of females, and hamsters thrive with regular light. Hamsters prefer quiet rooms and become stressed when sudden noise disturbs them.

Diet

In the wild hamsters are omnivorous, but mostly eat plants.

For captive hamsters, researchers design diets to maximize growth, breeding, milk production in mothers, and the maintenance of health in adult hamsters. The diet of the hamster is less studied than the diet of other laboratory rodents. A typical nutrient recommendation for a hamster diet is 17-23% crude protein, 4.5% crude fat, and 6-8% crude fiber. It must include Vitamin E. Gatchalian-Yee et al 1995 finds a high cholesterol diet  especially in combination with safflower oil  to produce signs consistent with metabolic disease. Safe vegetables for Syrian hamsters include cucumber, carrots, celery, kale, and Romaine lettuce (not iceberg). Apples are an appropriate fruit to offer. Adult hamsters eat 7-15 grams of food daily. Food should not consist solely of pellets, so a mix of seeds and other hamster-safe ingredients is best. Treats such as sunflower seeds are not important to a hamster's health, but hand-feeding treats will increase their trust.

Hamsters will drink up to 10ml of water for every 100g of hamster bodyweight. Nursing mother hamsters will want extra water. It can be difficult to provide fresh water to hamsters in a water dish because they are likely to soil it with bedding and need it changed twice daily. Water bowls are easy to clean, and have a natural drinking angle. Water bottles in cages must be positioned at a height that the hamster can reach without stretching.

Hamsters hoard their food, and will carry it to a hiding place. They seem to not care whether their food is served in a dish or placed on the floor (although scatter feeding can provide entertainment for some hamsters). Uneaten fresh vegetables should be removed after a day or so to prevent rotting.

Handling
Hamsters that are frequently and gently handled will learn to respond peacefully. However, enforcing trust by taming is very important.  When hamsters bite, they bite in front of them. A typical hamster-holding technique is to grasp the hamster from above around its belly with a thumb and the third finger. With two hands, a hamster may be cupped and held while left free to walk on the palms.  Sleeping hamsters often bite when disturbed. Allow a hamster several days to become familiar with its new home. Then, gently offer it treats, which it will shortly take from your palm, beginning its willingness to be handled. However, remember that some individuals prefer to be left alone and cannot be tamed.

It is important to know that, due to their poor eyesight, hamsters will jump from any platform without regard for height or consideration for their wellbeing. Therefore, there should be no way for them to fall more than 15 cm (6 inches) in their enclosure. For the same reason, never carry or let a hamster ride around on shoulders; they lack a tail for balance and can easily fall.

Hamsters are less likely to bite a bare hand than a gloved one. If a hamster seems like it might bite, but must be handled, it may be collected by allowing it to explore a can or jar.

Exercise wheels

TVT (Tierärztliche Vereinigung für Tierschutz) recommend wheels should be at least  for Syrian hamsters, since smaller diameters lead to permanent spinal curvatures, especially in young animals. They also recommend a solid running surface because rungs or mesh can cause injury.

Avoid using wire and mesh exercise wheels to protect them from such conditions as bumblefoot, a painful inflammation of their foot pads.

Domestication
In the first ten years after the 1930 start of the domestication of the Syrian hamster, 70 scientific articles were published based on Syrian hamster research and six of those concerned caring for hamsters. In 1945 at the New York Academy of Science held a conference on animal colony maintenance with a presentation that included care of Syrian hamsters. The 1947 first edition of the UFAW Handbook contained a chapter on the care of Syrian hamsters. In 1950 The Care and Breeding of Laboratory Animals contained a chapter on Syrian hamster care, with recommendations on cage size, handling hamsters, hamster diet, cleaning hamsters, and hamster breeding. In 1960 the Institute of Laboratory Animal Resources published a guide on the care and breeding of Syrian hamsters.

See also
Hamster cage
Hamster wheel

Notes

References

External links

How to Care for Syrian Hamsters by wikiHow
SYRIAN HAMSTER CARE, a video review by YouTuber ChocolateColors26

Animal welfare